Kazanskaya is a rural locality (a stanitsa) in Verkhnedonskoy District of Rostov Oblast, Russia, located on the left bank of Don River  from Rostov-on-Don. Population:   It is also the administrative center of Verkhnedonskoy District.

Geography 
It is situated in northern part of Rostov Oblast on the left bank of Don River close to Vyoshenskaya stanitsa and border with Voronezh Oblast.

History 
А map of Southern Russia from Isaac Massa's book printed in 1638 indicates a crossing of the Don river called Casanski Perevoos (lit. Kazan crossing) on the place of the present settlement. This was probably a crossing on a road from the Don Host to the city of Kazan.

An explorer of the Don Host Oblast and an envoy of Peter I Rigelman referred to the village as being established in 1647. After the victory of Tsar Ivan the Terrible over the Kazan Khanate, where the Cossacks played a key role, he granted them Don lands. These territories were rich in fisheries, with agriculture, viticulture, and trade also being developed rapidly.

In 1690, on the recommendation of Peter I, the Cossacks decided to move their settlement upstream along the Don. Yet at its present place the stanitsa of Kazanskaya was settled only in 1740. It is one of the oldest settlements in Don region.

Places of interest 
 
 Church of the Holy Trinity, a Russian Orthodox church built in 1914.

References

Rural localities in Rostov Oblast
Don Host Oblast